Edwin John Alley (30 July 1881 – 18 July 1949) was an Australian rules footballer who played with South Melbourne in the Victorian Football League (VFL). Some AFL sources list his name as Ned Alley.

Football

South Melbourne (VFL)
Alley appeared in 15 of South Melbourne 17 games in the 1902 VFL season. He played just once the following year.

Williamstown (VFA)
He transferred to Williamstown in the VFA in 1905 and played 160 games and kicked 20 goals up until when the First World War intervened in 1915. In 1907, with regular captain Paddy Noonan having stood down, Alley captained Williamstown to an 18-point grand final victory over West Melbourne, in the Victorian Football Association. This gave him the distinction of being Williamstown's first ever premiership captain.

He also served as captain-coach for part of 1911 after Bert Amy resigned and as captain in 1915.

Third Australian Divisional Team (First AIF)
He played for the (winning) Third Australian Divisional team in the famous "Pioneer Exhibition Game" of Australian Rules football, held in London, in October 1916. A news film was taken at the match.

Hawthorn (VFA)
After returning from the War, he went to Hawthorn in the VFA in 1919. In 1920 he was appointed captain-coach, but stood down midway through the season. Alley was still playing football with Mitcham in 1924 at the age of 43.

Military service
Alley, who made his living as an engineer, served overseas with the 3rd Pioneer Battalion during World War I.

Death
He died at his Canterbury, Victoria residence on 18 July 1949.

See also
 1916 Pioneer Exhibition Game

Footnotes

References
 Pioneer Exhibition Game Australian Football: in aid of British and French Red Cross Societies: 3rd Australian Division v. Australian Training Units at Queen's Club, West Kensington, on Saturday, October 28th, 1916, at 3pm, Wightman & Co., (London), 1919.
 Holmesby, Russell & Main, Jim (2007), The Encyclopedia of AFL Footballers, BAS Publishing. .
 Richardson, N. (2016), The Game of Their Lives, Pan Macmillan Australia: Sydney. 
 First World War Embarkation Roll: Private Edwin John Alley (135), collection of the Australian War Memorial.
 First World War Nominal Roll: Private Edwin John Alley (135), collection of the Australian War Memorial.
 Private Edwin John Alley (135), National Archives of Australia.

External links
 Ned Alley, at AFL Tables.
 
 Ted Alley, at The VFA Project.

1881 births
1949 deaths
Australian rules footballers from Victoria (Australia)
Sydney Swans players
Williamstown Football Club players
Participants in "Pioneer Exhibition Game" (London, 28 October 1916)
Hawthorn Football Club (VFA) players
Hawthorn Football Club (VFA) coaches
Australian military personnel of World War I
Military personnel from Victoria (Australia)